The Worcester-class ships of the line were a class of three 64-gun third rates, designed for the Royal Navy by Sir Thomas Slade.

Ships

Builder: Portsmouth Dockyard
Ordered: 16 November 1765
Launched: 17 October 1769
Fate: Broken up, 1816

Builder: Chatham Dockyard
Ordered: 12 October 1768
Launched: 28 June 1775
Fate: Wrecked, 1780

Builder: Portsmouth Dockyard
Ordered: 12 October 1768
Launched: 3 September 1777
Fate: Sold out of the service, 1837

References

Lavery, Brian (2003) The Ship of the Line – Volume 1: The development of the battlefleet 1650–1850. Conway Maritime Press. .

 
Ship of the line classes
Ship classes of the Royal Navy